Chrysohypnum is a genus of mosses belonging to the family Hypnaceae.

Species:
 Chrysohypnum brachycarpum (G. Roth) Warnst.
 Chrysohypnum chrysophyllum (Brid.) Loeske
 Chrysohypnum decursivulum (Müll. Hal. & Kindb.) J.J.Amann

References

Hypnaceae
Moss genera